Mercury Lane is the debut album of American country music singer Jimmie Allen. It was released on October 12, 2018 via Broken Bow Records' Stoney Creek imprint. The album includes the singles "Best Shot" and "Make Me Want To".

Content
The album is named after the street on which Allen grew up. He wrote over half of the album's 15 tracks. Serving as producer are Eric Torres and Ash Bowers, the latter of whom also formerly recorded on Stoney Creek. Of the album's content, Allen said that it "touches on all of those ideals and truly feels like I’m sharing a piece of my heart with the world. I’ve been working toward this moment for so long; I can’t wait to share it with everyone." The track "Boy Gets a Truck" was previously recorded by Keith Urban on his 2016 album Ripcord.

Critical reception
CelebMix reviewer Laura Klonowski called it "an accomplished, polished record" and "a coming of age country album that firmly puts Jimmie Allen on the map as the most exciting male country artist currently on the scene." Pip Ellwood-Hughes of Entertainment Focus thought that the album was "solid", while praising Allen's vocals on "Wait for It" and "Underdog" and the lyrics of "How to Be Single", but also stating that "he plays it a little too safe opting for songs that are likely to hit on radio rather than connect with the listener." It received 3 out of 5 stars from Stephen Thomas Erlewine of AllMusic, who wrote that "Possessed with a friendly, unassuming voice, Allen is pleasing to hear, but he fades into the background a bit too easily."

Commercial performance
The album debuted at No. 11 on Top Country Albums, with 3,000 copies sold and 7,000 in equivalent album units.  It sold a further 900 copies the following week. It has sold 13,800 copies in the United States as of April 2019.

Track listing

Personnel
Adapted from AllMusic

Jimmie Allen - lead vocals, background vocals
Dave Cohen - Hammond B-3 organ, keyboards, piano
David Dorn - Hammond B-3 organ, keyboards, piano
Lee Hendricks - bass guitar
Mark Hill - bass guitar
Brandon Hood - electric guitar
Evan Hutchings - drums, programming
Troy Lancaster - electric guitar
Gale Mayes - choir
Rob McNelley - electric guitar
Andrea Merritt - choir
Wendy Moten - choir
Justin Ostrander - electric guitar
Adam Shoenfeld - electric guitar
Eric Torres - background vocals
Ilya Toshinsky - banjo, acoustic guitar, electric guitar, mandolin

Charts

Weekly charts

Year-end charts

References

2018 debut albums
BBR Music Group albums
Jimmie Allen albums